The Most Reverend Gabriel O'Kelly (died 4 August 1731) was an Irish Roman Catholic clergyman who served as the Bishop of Elphin from 1718 to 1731.

References

1731 deaths
Roman Catholic bishops of Elphin
Year of birth unknown